Chorro  may refer to:
El Chorro, a village in Malaga, Andalusia, Spain
El Chorro, Formosa, farm village in the Formosa province, Argentina
El Chorro, Uruguay, a resort in the Maldonado Department, Uruguay
Rancho El Chorro, a Mexican land grant in California (1845)

See also
Choro